Treehouse is the debut studio album by American electronic dance music duo Sofi Tukker. It was released on April 13, 2018, through Ultra Records. The album spawned seven singles, including "Best Friend", which features Nervo, the Knocks and Alisa Ueno and became Sofi Tukker's first entry on the US Billboard Hot 100 chart, reaching number 81. The song also figured in the top 20 of pop, alternative, and dance US charts. The album's second track, "Energia", received a remix, subtitled "Parte 2", with additional vocals by Brazilian singer Pabllo Vittar and additional writing by Arthur Marques, Pablo Bispo and Rodrigo Gorky. The fourth track, "Batshit", was used in the ninth episode of the second season of Marvel Television series Runaways, whilst a remix of "Good Time Girl" featuring Charlie Barker was used as the opening theme for the first six episodes of HBO series The New Pope. At the 61st ceremony of the Grammy Awards, Treehouse was nominated for Best Dance/Electronic Album.

Track listing

Charts

References

2018 debut albums
Sofi Tukker albums
Ultra Records albums